Joe Davison may refer to:

Joe Davison (footballer, born 1897) (1897–1965), English footballer who played for Middlesbrough, Portsmouth and Watford in the 1920s and 1930s
Joe Davison (footballer, born 1919) (1919–1983), English footballer who played for Darlington in the 1940s and 1950s